Saviour Nwafor (born 10 January 2002) is a Nigerian professional footballer.

References

External links 
 
 Player's profile at pressball.by

2002 births
Living people
Nigerian footballers
Nigerian expatriate footballers
Nigerian expatriate sportspeople in Belarus
Expatriate footballers in Belarus
Association football midfielders
FC Rukh Brest players
FC Minsk players
Footballers from Enugu